Yanzhuang Township is a township of Xiyang County in the Taihang Mountains of eastern Shanxi province, China, located  southeast of the county seat. , it has 14 villages under its administration.

See also 
 List of township-level divisions of Shanxi

References 

Township-level divisions of Shanxi